Yuan Jie (719/723–772) was a Chinese poet and man of letters of the mid-Tang period. His courtesy name was Cishan, and he had several art names (see below).

He attained a jinshi degree in the imperial examination in 754, and served in several regional government posts before resigning in 769.

Among his most famous poems is the "Zei Tui Shi Guanli", which describes the state of the countryside following the An Lushan Rebellion, which he experienced first-hand. He also compiled a collection of poetry by his contemporaries, the Qie-zhong Ji, and was noted for his prose compositions. Books 240 and 241 of the Quan Tangshi are devoted to his poetry.

Biography 
Yuan Jie was born in either 719 or 723, in Wuchang (modern-day Wuhan, Hubei Province), Lu (modern Lushan County, Henan) or Henan (modern Luoyang, Henan Province).

He attained a jinshi degree in the imperial examination in 754, and was involved in the putting down of the An Lushan Rebellion.

He died in 772.

Names 
His courtesy name was Cishan, and his art names included Manlang, Aosou, and Qiganzi.

Poetry 
There is a ten-volume, Ming-era anthology of his poetry called the Yuan Cishan Ji.

His  poem "Zei Tui Shi Guanli", which he wrote while stationed in Dao Prefecture and which describes the state of society immediately following An Lushan's rebellion, was highly praised by Du Fu, and is seen as a forerunner of the works of Bai Juyi.

He also compiled the Qie-zhong Ji, a 760 collection of 24 poems by seven of his contemporaries, whose moral temper he admired but who did not hold official position.

Prose 
He is often listed alongside Xiao Yingshi and Li Hua as a forerunner of the gu wen movement.

References

Cited works 
 
 
 
 
 
  (Amazon Kindle edition.)

External links 
Books of the Quan Tangshi that include collected poems of Yuan Jie at the Chinese Text Project:
Book 240
Book 241

719 births
723 births
772 deaths
8th-century Chinese poets
Poets from Henan
Three Hundred Tang Poems poets
Tang dynasty politicians